Ranini Cundasawmy (born 19 May 1984) is a Mauritian Muay Thai, Savate and Kun Khmer (Pradal Serey) fighter. She has won several national and world championships of the World Muay Thai Federation.

Early life
Cundasawmy was born on 19 May 1984 at Victoria Hospital in Mauritius Island. From 1984 to 1994 she lived at Pop Henessy Beau Bassin, three brothers and two sisters, Rajen, Rajesh, Jean Francois, Rajini and Annais. His father Mario and her mother is Munusami.

She attended the Pre Primary and Primary School of Maingard in Beau Bassin, then the secondary school of Villes Soeurs in Beau Bassin. At the age of 16 she left villes soeurs secondary school to continue her studies at St Bartholomew's in Port-Louis.

After completing the Higher School Certificate (HSC) she wanted to continue her studies at the University of Mauritius unfortunately her family was not able to afford the cost so she was not able to continue her studies.

After her studies she started to practice kickboxing and worked as a pharmacy helper. She practiced kickboxing to keep fit for one year. 

In 2002 she changed profession and start to work as chat animator at Toolink Crm Ltd, where she met the man who will become her coach and husband Cundasawmy Louis Patrick. The became good friends and he start training Ranini. She get married in 2007. Patrick Cundasawmy is now her coach and husband. In 2007 they both quit their jobs at Toolink Crm and started their own business known as DJP Productions.

Sports career
2005 to 2020 she fought into different Martial Arts Style ( Boxe Francaise Savate, Kyokushin, Ju Jitsu, La Croche, Croche Bataille, Taekwondo and Kun Khmer.  She won several National Championship, became several time World Champion in her category.  Ranini is also a Certified Muay Thai Instructor (KRU)  Certified by the MTIA (Muay Thai International Association) and Master Toddy Muay Thai Academy accredited by the Thai Ministry of Education.

She is also teaches Muay Thai and Kun Khmer ( Pradal Serey ) on a social purpose at BMA Bambous Martial Arts in her village Bambous.  BMA Provide free training sessions open to everyone

Fight records 2005-2019
 Muay Thai Local Fights.  (12 Fights.  12 win, 0 lost, 0 draw)
 Muay Thai International Fight. (8 Fight.  5 win, 3 lost, 0 draw)
 Boxe Française Savate Local Fights. (7 Fights.  6 Win, 1 Lost, 0 draw)
 La croche Local and International Lutte Traditionnelle de la Réunion (11 fights - 10 won, 1 lost, 0 draw)
 Kyokushin Local Fight (4 fights - 4 win, 0 lost, 0 draw)
 Taekwondo Local Fight (4 Fights. 4 win, 0 lost, 0 draw)
 

Total fights: 51 | Wins: 44 | Lost: 6 | Draw :0 | Wins by KO: 7 |

Awards and Palmares
 2006 - Boxe Française Jeux de l'ouest Champion 
 2011 - Mauritius National Muay Thai Champion 
 2012 - Mauritius National Muay Thai Champion)
 2013 - Won the Mauritius Muay Thai Female Championship Belt
 2013 - Mauritius National Muay Thai Champion
 2014 - Indian Ocean Croche Champion 
 2014 - World Championship Boxe Francaise Savate Assault (Bronze Medal) 
 2014 - Mauritius National Muay Thai Champion 
 2015 - Jeux des Iles 2015 La Croche (silver medal) - 59k 
 2015 - Jeux des Iles 2015 Croche Bataille (gold medal) - 50k   (synthèse de croche préhension et de moraingy percussion)
 2015 - Mauritius National Muay Thai Champion 
 2016 - Championnat Maurice de Croche - Champion 
 2016 - Championnat Maurice de Croche Bataille - Champion 
 2016 - Kyokushinkai National Tournament 2016 - Champion 
 2016 - WKF Muay Thai World Championship (Silver Medal - VICE WORLD CHAMPION 54  kg)  
 2016 - WKF Muay Thai World Championship (World Champion -50  kg)  
 2017 - WMF Muay Thai World Champion 2017 (WORLD CHAMPION Proam -46kg) 
 2018 - WMF Muay Thai World Champion 2018 (Gold Medal | WORLD CHAMPION am -48kg)  
 2019 - KIF Kun Khmer World Championship 2019 (Silver Medal | 46kg) 
2019 - WMF Muay Thai World Championship (Gold Medal | WORLD CHAMPION am-48kg)

References

Citations

External links

 Ranini Cundasawmy at Awakening Fighters
Video Gallery on YouTube
 

Mauritian Muay Thai practitioners
Female Muay Thai practitioners
Mauritian female martial artists
1984 births
Living people
People from Plaines Wilhems District
Mauritian people of Indian descent
Mauritian savateurs
Bambous, Mauritius